19+ is a Polish paradocumentary series airing on TVN. It premiered on 7 November 2016. The series focused on a group of students that has just graduated from secondary school and are embarking on their adult lives. The main character, Mela, has started up a videoblog about her life and those of her friends, and the series shows her and others recording videos, as well as scenes from their unrecorded lives.

Cast

Małgorzata Heretyk as Melania „Mela” (Melanie) Trzeciak 
Anna Zuch as Lena Gawrońska
Żaneta Kussa as Katarzyna Czerkawska (Kasia)
Michał Wilk as Rafał Malewicz
Marcin Dąbrowski as Oskar (Oscar) Prus
Marcel Opaliński as Kamil Pawlak
Diana Dudlińska as Lucyna Kruczek (Lucy, Greenpeace)
Kamil Sobczyk as Sebastian Szumiec (Seba)
Julia Drybczewska as Milena Dobek
Paulina Łabuda as Alicja „Ala” Motyl (Alice Butterfly)  
Konrad Żygadło as Stanisław Matusiak (Staszek)
Wiktor Durda as Kacper Borek
Natalia Koszyk as Jolanta Wysocka (Jola)
Beniamin Andrzejewski as Ireneusz Sobczak (Irek)
Dominika Przywara as Magdalena Staszak
Ernest Musiał as Arkadiusz Brzozowski
Malwina Roczniok as Iwona Małkowska (Mela's enemy)
Justyna Grzybowska as Zuzanna Jurewicz/Matylda Bogusz
Daniel Tecław as Bruno Wasiak
Marcelina Ziętek as Kaja Jarosik
Patryk Dębosz as Paweł Kwapiński
Izabela Maciuszek as Marta Prus (Oscar's mother)
Renata Furdyna Makowska as Aneta Pawlak Czerkawska) (Kasia's mother)
Piotr Urbaniak as Mariusz Pawlak (Kamil's father)
Karolina Strauss as Ela Tkaczyk
Tomasz Hajduk as Szczepan Kapusta („Frodo”)
Grzegorz Widera as Marek Motyl (Ala's father)
Weronika Witek as Sara Rogalska
Tymoteusz Kutz as Filip Sagaj
Magdalena Sonik as Julia Malewicz (daughter of Kasia and Rafał, child)
Marek Ulman as Gabriel Herman
Jerzy Cisak as Stanisław Trzeciak (Mela's father)
Anita Nissenbaum as Ewa Trzeciak (Mela's mother)
Magdalena Król as Monika Różycka
Kacper Kosiba as Bartek Trzeciak (Mela's brother)
Kinga Brodecka as Pola Kaszuba
Andrzej Skorupa as Miłosz Dusak
Gabriela Bukowska as Magdalena Wolska
Hubert Dyl as Krzysztof Markowski („Prezes”)
Karol Szczepanik as Marcel Piekarski
Łukasz Pawlak as Jan Król
Aneta Kołodziejek jako Ala's mother
Katarzyna Piotrowska-Ornatkiewicz as Marzena Gawrońska (Lena's mother)
Alicja Wróbel as Alicja Pawlak (Kamil's mother)
Jacek Januchowski as Tadeusz Kruczek (Lucy's father)
Danuta Bukowska as Magdalena's mother
Aneta Jarosz as Barbara Szumiec (Sebastian's mother)
Zofia Rusek as Zofia Sobczak (Irek's grandmother)
Marek Wolny as Marian Szumiec (Sebastian's father)
Marcin Przybyłek as Aleksander (Kasia's father)
Edyta Tarchała as mother of Arkadiusz
Mirosław Skibiński as Tomasz Markowski (father of Krzysztof)

References

Television shows set in Poland
2010s Polish television series
2020s Polish television series
2016 Polish television series debuts
2022 Polish television series endings